Emma Kate Dean is an Australian singer-songwriter and multi-instrumentalist from Brisbane, Queensland. She has performed in solo shows and her Emma Dean Band as well as with the Kate Miller-Heidke Band (2003–2006).  The Emma Dean Band was formed in 2005 with Emma's brother, Tony Dean on drums, Dane Pollock on guitar, John Turnbull on bass guitar and Rachel Meredith on cello.

Dean is a graduate of the Queensland Conservatorium Griffith University.

Discography

Albums

 Real Life Computer Game (June 2008, Doily Records/MGM Distribution – see ref.16)
 The Tempest Soundtrack (June 2009, Emma Dean and Colin Webber/Zen Zen Zo/Real Productions – see ref. 18).
 Dr. Dream and the Imaginary Pop Cabaret (2010, Doily Records – see ref. 21)

EPs

 Hanging Out the Washing (2005, self-release – see ref. 10)
 Face Painter (November 2006, Doily Records/MRA Distribution – see ref. 12)
 Downside Up (2009, Emma Dean and Jacob Diefenbach)
 Into the Woods (2012, Geppetto, MGM Distribution)
 White (2013, CandyRat Records – see ref. 32)
 Red (2013, self-release – see ref. 34)

References

External links 
 
 http://www.emmadean.com/articles_emma.htm – contains a photographic archive and chronological listing of articles and interviews spanning the years 2010 to 2013
 http://www.candyrat.com/artists/EmmaDean/

Australian women singer-songwriters
Queensland Conservatorium Griffith University alumni
Living people
Musicians from Brisbane
Year of birth missing (living people)